Aedh Ailghin (died 767) was the 22nd King of Uí Maine.

Reign
Only one major event of Aedh's reign appear in the annals, sub anno 751, though he himself is nowhere mentioned:

The battle of Bealach Cro was gained by Crimhthann over the Dealbhna of Ui Maine, in which was slain Finn mac Arbh, Lord of Dealbhna, at Tibra Finn, and the Dealbhna were slaughtered about him. The Ui Maine were contending with them for the cantred between the Suca (the River Suck) and the Sinainn (the River Shannon), for this was called the cantred of Dealbhna.

The identity of Crimthann the Warlike is uncertain. The only person of the name wielding any authority at the time was Crimhthann mac Reachtghal, who was Abbot of Clonfert from 757 to 761.

Aedh's reign coincided with that of Donn Cothaid mac Cathail (d. 773), last of the Uí Fiachrach Muaidhe Kings of Connacht. Who defeated the Ui Briun at the battle of Druim Robaig

Notes

References

Annals of Ulster at CELT: Corpus of Electronic Texts at University College Cork
Annals of Tigernach at CELT: Corpus of Electronic Texts at University College Cork
Revised edition of McCarthy's synchronisms at Trinity College Dublin.
Byrne, Francis John (2001), Irish Kings and High-Kings, Dublin: Four Courts Press,

External links
Commentary by Dan M. Wiley (The Cycles of the Kings Web Project)

People from County Galway
People from County Roscommon
767 deaths
Year of birth unknown
8th-century Irish monarchs
Kings of Uí Maine